Risti may refer to:
Risti, Nepal, village development committee in Tanahu District, Gandaki Zone, Nepal
Risti, Estonia, small borough in Lääne-Nigula Parish, Lääne County, Estonia
Risti Parish, former municipality in Estonia
Risti, Hiiu County, village in Hiiumaa Parish, Hiiu County, Estonia

See also
Harju-Risti, village in Lääne-Harju Parish, Harju County, Estonia
Ristiküla (disambiguation)